Frederick Wallace Edwards FRS (28 November 1888 in Fletton, Peterborough – 15 November 1940 in London), was an English entomologist. Edwards was known in the field of entomology for his work on Diptera.

Edwards worked in the British Museum (Natural History) which contains his collections made on his expeditions to Norway and Sweden (1923), Switzerland and Austria (1925), Argentina and Chile (1926/27), with Raymond Corbett Shannon, Corsica and USA (1928), the Baltic (1933), Kenya and Uganda (1934), with Ernest Gibbins, and the Pyrenees (1935). He was able to oversee publication of Alwyn M. Evan's monograph on The Mosquitoes of the Ethiopian Region after her death in 1937.

Among the unusual insects that he described was the flightless marine midge Pontomyia. The mosquito genus Fredwardsius is named to honor his work establishing the generic and subgeneric framework which forms the basis for modern day systematics of the Culicidae of the world.

Works
For a partial list of works see the references in Sabrosky's Family Group Names in Diptera

References

Bibliography
Alexander, C. P. 1941 [Edwards, F. W.] Can. Entomol. 73 94-95 
Anonym 1941: [Edwards, F. W.]  Indian J. Ent. 3 149 
Blair, K. 1941: [Edwards, F. W.] Entomologist's Monthly Magazine (3) 77 20 
Evenhuis, N. L. 1997: Litteratura taxonomica dipterorum (1758-1930). Volume 1 (A-K); Volume 2 (L-Z). - Leiden, Backhuys Publishers 1; 2 VII+1-426; 427-871 1: 220-221, Portr.+Schr.verz. 
Imms, A. D. 1941: [Edwards, F. W.] Obit. Notices fellows Roy. Soc. London 3 735-745, Portr.

English entomologists
Dipterists
1888 births
1940 deaths
Fellows of the Royal Society
20th-century British zoologists